The Savannah River National Laboratory (SRNL) is a multi-program national laboratory for the U.S. Department of Energy’s (DOE) Office of Environmental Management. SRNL is located at the Savannah River Site (SRS) near Jackson, South Carolina. It was founded in 1951, as the Savannah River Laboratory. It was certified as a national laboratory on May 7, 2004.

SRNL research topics include environmental remediation, technologies for the hydrogen economy, handling of hazardous materials and technologies for prevention of nuclear proliferation.  It has specific experience in vitrification of nuclear waste and hydrogen storage initially developed to support production of tritium and plutonium at the Savannah River Site during the Cold War. SRNL is a founding member of the South Carolina Hydrogen & Fuel Cell Alliance (SCHFCA).

SRNL employs 980 people and has an annual programmatic budget of 249 million U.S. Dollars (2017).

SRNL was operated by Savannah River Nuclear Solutions, LLC for the U.S. Department of Energy from 2008 to 2021. The LLC is a partnership between Fluor Corporation, Newport News Nuclear, Inc. (a subsidiary of Huntington Ingalls Industries) and Honeywell International.

In 2020, the Department of Energy approved a split in the SRS Maintenance and Operations contract. The agency awarded the SRNL M&O contract to Battelle Savannah River Alliance (BSRA), retaining Savannah River Nuclear Solutions, LLC for the maintenance and operations of the Savannah River Site. BSRA is wholly owned by Battelle Memorial Institute and partners with five regional universities. Contract transition was completed in 2021.

See also
Savannah River Site
United States Department of Energy
United States Department of Energy National Laboratories
Top 100 US Federal Contractors
Institute of Nuclear Power Operations

References

External links
Official website for Savannah River National Laboratory (SRNL)
Official website for Savannah River Nuclear Solutions (SRNS)
Official website for the Savannah River Site (SRS)

Buildings and structures in Aiken County, South Carolina
United States Department of Energy national laboratories
Federally Funded Research and Development Centers
Savannah River Site
Research institutes in South Carolina